Wheelchair fencing has been contested at every Summer Paralympic Games since they were first held in 1960.

Summary

Medal table
Updated after the 2020 Summer Paralympics

Nations

See also
Fencing at the Summer Olympics

References

External links
 Wheelchair fencing at IPC web site

 
Paralympics
Wheelchair fencing